Stenoloba olivacea is a species of moth of the family Noctuidae. It is found in Taiwan.

The wingspan is 31–37 mm.

References

Moths described in 1914
Bryophilinae